Michael Lombardi (born 1964) is a Canadian-born entrepreneur, investor, publisher and author. He is currently CEO of Lombardi Media Corporation, a holding company that owns a group of businesses concentrated in publishing, digital media, customer contact services, consumer goods, direct marketing and product fulfillment. Lombardi has been listed in Who's Who in Canadian Business.

Early life 
Lombardi was born in Toronto in 1964. He attended Chaminade College before attending York University and later received his MBA from the Graduate Business School, Heriot-Watt University, Edinburgh, Scotland. In 1986, he founded Lombardi Publishing Corporation.

Business life 
Lombardi Publishing Corporation experienced rapid growth in the 2000s and was ranked several times as one of Canada's 100 fastest growing companies by Profit Magazine. Today, the company publishes financial e-letters, periodicals, newsletters, books and reports.

In the late 1990s, through his holding company, Lombardi started acquiring companies that supplied the Canadian direct marketing industry. Lombardi purchased Anvon Sale Tech Inc. and Templeman Direct Marketing Limited, two major suppliers to the Canadian direct marketing industry. The companies where merged into Clixx Direct Marketing Services Inc. which Lombardi eventually sold in 2010 to NYSE listed Cenveo Inc. In 2007, Lombardi Media Corporation made its first acquisition in the U.S. direct marketing industry.

Lombard Media Corporation became a public company in 1993 via a reverse-takeover of Golden Point Exploration Inc. In 2007, Lombardi, who was then the major shareholder of Lombardi Media Corporation with approximately 89% of the outstanding stock, purchased the remaining shares in a going-private transaction.

References

1964 births
Living people
American economics writers
American male non-fiction writers
American finance and investment writers
American publishers (people)
Alumni of Heriot-Watt University